Marcel Domergue (16 November 1901 – date of death unknown) was a French international footballer. He is mostly known for his international career and seven-year club stint at Red Star FC where he won the Coupe de France in 1928. Domergue made his international debut on 30 April 1922 in a 4–0 defeat to Spain. He was a member of the French teams that participated in the football tournament at both the 1924 and 1928 Summer Olympics.

References

Sources
 Denis Chaumier: Les Bleus. Tous les joueurs de l’équipe de France de 1904 à nos jours. Larousse, o.O. 2004, 
 Yves Dupont: La Mecque du football ou Mémoires d'un Dauphin. Compte d'auteur, Sète 1973
 L'Équipe/Gérard Ejnès: La belle histoire. L’équipe de France de football. L’Équipe, Issy-les-Moulineaux 2004, 
 L’Équipe/Gérard Ejnès: Coupe de France. La folle épopée. L’Équipe, Issy-les-Moulineaux 2007, 
 François de Montvalon/Frédéric Lombard/Joël Simon: Red Star. Histoires d’un siècle. Club du Red Star, Paris 1999, 
 Alfred Wahl/Pierre Lanfranchi: Les footballeurs professionnels des années trente à nos jours. Hachette, Paris 1995,

External links 
 
 

1901 births
Year of death missing
Association football midfielders
French footballers
Egyptian footballers
France international footballers
French people of Egyptian descent
Red Star F.C. players
FC Sète 34 players
Nîmes Olympique players
Olympic footballers of France
Footballers at the 1924 Summer Olympics
Footballers at the 1928 Summer Olympics